Daours is a commune in the Somme department in Hauts-de-France in northern France.

Geography
Daours station has rail connections to Amiens and Albert.

Population

See also
Communes of the Somme department

References

External links

 South Africans buried in Daours Communal Cemetery Extension

Communes of Somme (department)